Calderdale Metropolitan Borough Council is the local authority of the Metropolitan Borough of Calderdale in West Yorkshire, England. The council styles itself Calderdale Council. It is a metropolitan district council, one of five in West Yorkshire and one of 36 in the metropolitan counties of England, and provides the majority of local government services in Calderdale. Since 1 April 2014 it has been a constituent council of the West Yorkshire Combined Authority.

Premises
The council is based at Halifax Town Hall, which had been built for one of the council's predecessors, the Halifax Borough Council, in 1863.

Elections

Electoral arrangements
Calderdale is divided into 17 wards, each ward having three councillors for a total of 51 councillors. Councillors serve four-year terms, with one-third of the council elected every year except every fourth year when no councilors are elected.

The ward boundaries were redrawn in 2004 so the whole council was up for election. One third of the council was elected from 2006 onward.

Current political make-up
As of 2022 the council is controlled by Labour.

Historical political make-up

2020s

2010s

2000s

Wards

Mayor
The role of mayor is largely ceremonial in Calderdale. Political leadership is provided by the leader of the council. Former leaders are listed at Calderdale Metropolitan Borough Council elections. The mayors since 1974 have been:

References

External link

Metropolitan district councils of England
Local authorities in West Yorkshire
Leader and cabinet executives
Local education authorities in England
Billing authorities in England
1974 establishments in England